N.E. Thing Co. was a Canadian art collective producing work from 1967 to 1978.  Based in Vancouver, British Columbia, N.E. Thing Co.  was run by co-presidents Iain and Ingrid Baxter.

Seminal figures in the emergence of conceptual art movement in Canada during the late sixties, N.E. Thing Co. used corporate strategies to generate and frame its artistic practice.

History
Founded in 1966 by Iain and Ingrid Baxter, N.E. Thing Co. was established as a conceptual vehicle that viewed the art world as "parallel [to] consumer culture." N.E. Thing Co. was incorporated under the Companies Act in 1969. Focusing on an interdisciplinary practice and using photography, site-specific performances and installation, N.E. Thing Co. is seen as a "key catalyst and influence for Vancouver photoconceptualism" and is considered a precursor to the Vancouver School. N.E. Thing Co. created some of the earliest photoconceptual works to display a tendency to use photography to document "idea-works and their sites, as language games and thematic inventories and as reflective investigations of the social and architectural landscape."
N.E. Thing Co. disbanded in 1978 when Iain and Ingrid ended their relationship.

References

Bibliography
 Baxter, Iain and Ingrid Baxter. You Are Now in the Middle of a N.E. Thing Co. Landscape: Works by Iain and Ingrid Baxter, 1965-1971. Vancouver: The Gallery, 1993. 
 Mewburn, Charity. Sixteen Hundred Miles North of Denver. Vancouver: Morris and Helen Belkin Art Gallery, 1999. 
 National Film Board of Canada. B.C. Almanac(h) C-B. Vancouver: Presentation House Gallery, Reprint edition, 2015.

External links 
 N.E. Thing Co. Profile page at the Centre for Contemporary Canadian Bio Info and Collection of Images.
 VOX gallery Bio page with Text and Images.
 Shaw, Nancy.  Sitting the Banal: The Expanded Landscape of N.E. Thing Co.  essay at vancouver in the sixties website. Academic article contextualising NETCO's practice.
 Mewburn, Charity. Sixteen Hundred Miles North of Denver.  Exhibition essay from Morris and Helen Belkin Gallery solo show.

Canadian photographers
Canadian painters
Canadian sculptors
Canadian conceptual artists
Canadian installation artists